The 2002 Basildon District Council election took place on 2 May 2002 to elect members of Basildon District Council in Essex, England. The whole council was up for election with boundary changes since the last election in 2000. The council stayed under no overall control.

Background
A review of the boundaries on Basildon council made changes for this election leading to the whole council being elected. Several new wards were created for the election including Crouch, Pitsea South East and St Martin's.

Before the election both the Labour and Conservative parties had 19 seats, while the Liberal Democrats had 4 seats and Labour led a minority administration. Several councillors stood down at the election including the Labour leader of the council John Potter. Candidates standing in the election included the first member of the British National Party to do so, Matthew Single in Vange ward.

Election result
The results saw the Conservatives become the largest party on the council with 21 seats, but fail to win a majority. They gained 1 seat each from Labour and the Liberal Democrats, who were left with 18 and 3 seats respectively. However the expectation was that an alliance between Labour and the Liberal Democrats would continue to run the council as the outgoing Labour chairman could use his casting vote to keep Labour in power. Meanwhile, the British National Party failed to win a seat after coming fifth in Vange ward.

Following the election the alliance between Labour and the Liberal Democrats was confirmed in control of the council, with Labour councillor Nigel Smith, husband of Member of Parliament for Basildon Angela Smith, becoming the new leader of the council.

Ward results

Billericay East

Billericay West

Burstead

Crouch

Fryerns

Laindon Park

Langdon Hills

Lee Chapel North

Nethermayne

Pitsea North West

Pitsea South East

St Martin's

Vange

Wickford Castledon

Wickford North

Wickford Park

References

2002
2002 English local elections
2000s in Essex